The Bachelor was the first season of ABC reality television series The Bachelor. The show featured 31-year-old Alex Michel, a Harvard educated management consultant from Charlottesville, Virginia. The season premiered on March 25, 2002, and concluded on April 25, 2002 with Michel choosing to pursue a relationship with 23-year-old event planner Amanda Marsh. They broke up several months later.

Contestants
The following is the list of bachelorettes for this season:

Future appearances
Trista Rehn was chosen to be the Bachelorette for the first season of The Bachelorette. Shannon Oliver appeared in episode 3 of the first season of The Bachelorette to give Trista Rehn advice.

Amy Anzel appeared in Trista's wedding mini-series and would go on to act in several projects, most notably having a role in Kick Ass 2. She also competed in the UK version of The Apprentice in 2022.

Elimination Chart

 The contestant won the competition.
 The contestant was eliminated at the rose ceremony.

Episodes

References

01
2002 American television seasons
Television shows filmed in California
Television shows filmed in Arizona
Television shows filmed in Missouri
Television shows filmed in Kansas
Television shows filmed in New York City
Television shows filmed in Hawaii
Television shows filmed in Virginia